Charles Arthur Williams, Jr. (March 9, 1897 – July 6, 1931) was an American baseball shortstop in the Negro leagues. He played from 1921 to 1931, playing mostly with the Chicago American Giants. Williams died of ptomaine poisoning.

References

External links
 and Seamheads

1903 births
1931 deaths
Chicago American Giants players
Indianapolis ABCs players
Memphis Red Sox players
Baseball players from Texas
Sportspeople from Mobile, Alabama
20th-century African-American sportspeople
Baseball infielders
Deaths from food poisoning